Heaton Park BT Tower is a 238 foot (72.54 metres) tall telecommunication tower built of reinforced concrete close to the banks of Heaton Park Reservoir, at Heaton Park, Manchester, England. Heaton Park BT Tower is one of the few British towers built of reinforced concrete, and one of seven BT towers of the 'Chilterns' design.

Source: Ben Collins: 1980s folklore originating from the Dumers Lane area of Radcliffe, M26 suggest that the tower was often referred to as “The Scullion” amongst local children seeking adventure / mischief. 

During the Cold War, the British government proposed a communications network that (it was hoped) would survive a nuclear attack. Radio stations (including the Heaton Park Tower) would maintain national and international communications before, during and after a nuclear emergency, transmitting microwave radio signals in a network known as Backbone. Spurs feeding into the network were provided at three locations: London, Manchester (Heaton Park Tower) and Birmingham. Whether the plan for the Backbone network was realised is information protected by the Official Secrets Act 1911 but, during the planning process, HM Government denied in Parliament that there was anything secretive about the tower or its function.

Beside the tower was a monitoring station (one of hundreds across the country) to record the blast and fallout in the event of a nuclear war. The station provided for three men from the Royal Observer Corps (ROC) to live underground whilst recording what was happening above ground in the event of a nuclear strike.

See also
British Telecom microwave network
Telecommunications towers in the United Kingdom

References

External links
Photograph

Transmitter sites in England
Communication towers in the United Kingdom
Buildings and structures in Manchester
British Telecom buildings and structures
1960s establishments in England